Journey into Spring is a 1958 British short documentary film directed by Ralph Keene, and made by British Transport Films. It won the 1958 BAFTA Award for Best Documentary, and was nominated for two Academy Awards - one for Best Documentary Short, the other for Best Live Action Short.

The film, partly a tribute to Gilbert White, author of The Natural History of Selborne, features a commentary by the poet Laurie Lee, and camerawork by the wildlife cinematographer Patrick Carey.

References

External links

Journey into Spring at Screenonline

1958 short films
1958 films
1958 documentary films
1950s short documentary films
British short documentary films
British Transport Films
1950s English-language films
1950s British films